The women's double sculls competition at the 2002 Asian Games in Busan was held from 30 September to 3 October at the Nakdong River.

Schedule 
All times are Korea Standard Time (UTC+09:00)

Results

Heats 
 Qualification: 1 → Final A (FA), 2–4 → Repechage (R)

Heat 1

Heat 2

Repechage 
 Qualification: 1–4 → Final A (FA), 5–6 → Final B (FB)

Finals

Final B

Final A

References 

2002 Asian Games Official Reports, Pages 550–554
Results Final A
Results Final B

External links 
Official Website

Rowing at the 2002 Asian Games